HNoMS Ellida may refer to one of the following Royal Norwegian Navy ships:

 , a Norwegian sailing corvette commissioned in 1849 and sold off in 1866
 , a 1st class gunboat launched in 1880, and rebuilt as a steam-powered corvette in 1896; sold off in 1925
 , the former American tank landing ship USS LST-50; acquired by the Royal Norwegian Navy in 1952; returned to the US in 1960

Royal Norwegian Navy ship names